Oyón in Spanish or Oion in Basque is a town and municipality located in the province of Álava, in the Basque Country, northern Spain. The town was formed by the incorporation of the towns Barriobusto and Labraza.
 It is located just 5km north of the city of Logroño in La Rioja.

Oyón is a sister city of the French town Saint-Martin-de-Seignanx.

References

External links
 Oyón-Oion in the Bernardo Estornés Lasa - Auñamendi Encyclopedia 

Municipalities in Álava